Sekyere Afram Plains is one of the constituencies represented in the Parliament of Ghana. It elects one Member of Parliament (MP) by the first past the post system of election. Sekyere Afram Plains is located in the Sekyere Afram Plains District in the Ashanti Region of Ghana.

Boundaries
The seat is located within the Sekyere Afram Plains District of the Ashanti Region of Ghana. This constituency was part of the newly created constituency for 2012 general elections in Ghana.

Elections

See also
List of Ghana Parliament constituencies

References

'

Parliamentary constituencies in the Ashanti Region